The 12-hour clock is a time convention in which the 24 hours of the day are divided into two periods: a.m. (from Latin , translating to "before midday") and p.m. (from Latin , translating to "after midday"). Each period consists of 12 hours numbered: 12 (acting as 0), 1, 2, 3, 4, 5, 6, 7, 8, 9, 10 and 11. The 12-hour clock was developed from the second millennium BC and reached its modern form in the 16th century AD. 

The 12-hour time convention is common in several English-speaking nations and former British colonies, as well as a few other countries. There is no widely accepted convention for how midday and midnight should be represented: in English-speaking countries, "12p.m." indicates 12 o'clock noon, while "12a.m." means 12 o'clock midnight.

History and use

The natural day-and-night division of a calendar day forms the fundamental basis as to why each day is split into two cycles. Originally there were two cycles: one cycle which could be tracked by the position of the Sun (day), followed by one cycle which could be tracked by the Moon and stars (night). This eventually evolved into the two 12-hour periods which are used today, one called "a.m." starting at midnight and another called "p.m." starting at noon. Noon itself is rarely abbreviated today; but if it is, it is denoted "m."

The 12-hour clock can be traced back as far as Mesopotamia and ancient Egypt. Both an Egyptian sundial for daytime use and an Egyptian water clock for night-time use were found in the tomb of Pharaoh Amenhotep I. Dating to c. 1500 BC, these clocks divided their respective times of use into 12 hours each.

The Romans also used a 12-hour clock: daylight was divided into 12 equal hours (thus hours having varying length throughout the year) and the night was divided into four watches.

The first mechanical clocks in the 14th century, if they had dials at all, showed all 24 hours using the 24-hour analog dial, influenced by astronomers' familiarity with the astrolabe and sundial and by their desire to model the Earth's apparent motion around the Sun. In Northern Europe these dials generally used the 12-hour numbering scheme in Roman numerals but showed both a.m. and p.m. periods in sequence. This is known as the double-XII system and can be seen on many surviving clock faces, such as those at Wells and Exeter.

Elsewhere in Europe, numbering was more likely to be based on the 24-hour system (I to XXIV). The 12-hour clock was used throughout the British empire.

During the 15th and 16th centuries, the 12-hour analog dial and time system gradually became established as standard throughout Northern Europe for general public use. The 24-hour analog dial was reserved for more specialized applications, such as astronomical clocks and chronometers.

Most analog clocks and watches today use the 12-hour dial, on which the shorter hour hand rotates once every 12 hours and twice in one day. Some analog clock dials have an inner ring of numbers along with the standard 1-to-12 numbered ring.  The number 12 is paired either with a 00 or a 24, while the numbers 1 through 11 are paired with the numbers 13 through 23, respectively. This modification allows the clock to also be read in 24-hour notation. This kind of 12-hour clock can be found in countries where the 24-hour clock is preferred.

Use by country

In several countries the 12-hour clock is the dominant written and spoken system of time, predominantly in nations that were part of the former British Empire, for example, the United Kingdom, Republic of Ireland, the United States, Canada  (excluding Quebec), Australia, New Zealand, South Africa, India, Pakistan, and Bangladesh, and others follow this convention as well, such as Mexico and the former American colony of the Philippines. In most countries, however, the 24-hour clock is the standard system used, especially in writing. Some nations in Europe and Latin America use a combination of the two, preferring the 12-hour system in colloquial speech but using the 24-hour system in written form and in formal contexts.

The 12-hour clock in speech often uses phrases such as  ... in the morning, ... in the afternoon, ... in the evening, and ...at night. Rider's British Merlin almanac for 1795 and a similar almanac for 1773 published in London used them. Other than in English-speaking countries and some Spanish-speaking countries, the terms a.m. and p.m. are seldom used and often unknown.

Computer support
In most countries, computers by default show the time in 24-hour notation. Most operating systems, including Microsoft Windows and Unix-like systems such as Linux and macOS, activate the 12-hour notation by default for a limited number of language and region settings. This behaviour can be changed by the user, such as with the Windows operating system's "Region and Language" settings.

Abbreviations

The Latin abbreviations a.m. and p.m. (often written "am" and "pm", "AM" and "PM", or "A.M." and "P.M.") are used in English and Spanish. However, noon is rarely abbreviated in any of these languages, noon normally being written in full. In Portuguese, there are two official options and many others used, for example, using 21:45, 21h45 or 21h45min (official ones) or 21:45 or 9:45 p.m. In Irish, a.m. and i.n. are used, standing for ar maidin ("in the morning") and iarnóin ("afternoon") respectively.

Most other languages lack formal abbreviations for "before noon" and "after noon", and their users use the 12-hour clock only orally and informally. However, in many languages, such as Russian and Hebrew, informal designations are used, such as "9 in the morning" or "3 in the night".

When abbreviations and phrases are omitted, one may rely on sentence context and societal norms to reduce ambiguity. For example, if one commutes to work at "9:00", 9:00 a.m. may be implied, but if a social dance is scheduled to begin at "9:00", it may begin at 9:00 p.m.

Related conventions

Typography
Depending on the style guide referenced, the abbreviations "a.m." and "p.m." are variously written in small capitals ("" and ""), uppercase letters without a period ("AM" and "PM"), uppercase letters with periods, or lowercase letters ("am" and "pm" or, "a.m." and "p.m."). With the advent of computer generated and printed schedules, especially airlines, advertising, and television promotions, the "M" character is often omitted as providing no additional information as in "9:30A" or "10:00P".

Some style guides suggest the use of a space between the number and the a.m. or p.m. abbreviation. Style guides recommend not using a.m. and p.m. without a time preceding it.

The hour/minute separator varies between countries: some use a colon, others use a period (full stop), and still others use the letter h. (In some usages, particularly "military time", of the 24-hour clock, there is no separator between hours and minutes. This style is not generally seen when the 12-hour clock is used.)

Encoding
Unicode specifies codepoints for "a.m." and "p.m." symbols, which are intended to be used only with Chinese-Japanese-Korean (CJK) character sets, as they take up exactly the same space as one CJK character:

Informal speech and rounding off
In speaking, it is common to round the time to the nearest five minutes and/or express the time as the past (or to) the closest hour; for example, "five past five" (5:05). Minutes past the hour means those minutes are added to the hour; "ten past five" means 5:10. Minutes to, 'til and of the hour mean those minutes are subtracted; "ten of five", "ten 'til five", and "ten to five" all mean 4:50.

Fifteen minutes is often called a quarter hour, and thirty minutes is often known as a half hour. For example, 5:15 can be phrased "(a) quarter past five" or "five-fifteen"; 5:30 can be "half past five", "five-thirty" or simply "half five". The time 8:45 may be spoken as "eight forty-five" or "(a) quarter to nine".

In older English, it was common for the number 25 to be expressed as "five-and-twenty".  In this way the time 8:35 may be phrased as "five-and-twenty to 9", although this styling fell out of fashion in the later part of the 1900s and is now rarely used.

Instead of meaning 5:30, the "half five" expression is sometimes used to mean 4:30, or "half-way to five", especially for regions such as the American Midwest and other areas that have been particularly influenced by German culture. This meaning follows the pattern choices of many Germanic and Slavic languages, including Serbo-Croatian, Dutch, Danish, Russian and Swedish, as well as Hungarian and Finnish.

Moreover, in situations where the relevant hour is obvious or has been recently mentioned, a speaker might omit the hour and just say "quarter to (the hour)", "half past" or "ten 'til" to avoid an elaborate sentence in informal conversations. These forms are often commonly used in television and radio broadcasts that cover multiple time zones at one-hour intervals.

In describing a vague time of day, a speaker might say the phrase "seven-thirty, eight" to mean sometime around 7:30 or 8:00. Such phrasing can be misinterpreted for a specific time of day (here 7:38), especially by a listener not expecting an estimation. The phrase "about seven-thirty or eight" clarifies this.

Some more ambiguous phrasing might be avoided. Within five minutes of the hour, the phrase "five of seven" (6:55) can be heard "five-oh-seven" (5:07). "Five to seven" or even "six fifty-five" clarifies this.

Formal speech and times to the minute

Minutes may be expressed as an exact number of minutes past the hour specifying the time of day (e.g., 6:32 p.m. is "six thirty-two"). Additionally, when expressing the time using the "past (after)" or "to (before)" formula, it is conventional to choose the number of minutes below 30 (e.g., 6:32 p.m. is conventionally "twenty-eight minutes to seven" rather than "thirty-two minutes past six").

In spoken English, full hours are often represented by the numbered hour followed by o'clock (10:00 as ten o'clock, 2:00 as two o'clock). This may be followed by the "a.m." or "p.m." designator, though some phrases such as in the morning, in the afternoon, in the evening, or at night more commonly follow analog-style terms such as o'clock, half past three, and quarter to four. O'clock itself may be omitted, telling a time as four a.m. or four p.m. Minutes ":01" to ":09" are usually pronounced as oh one to oh nine (nought or zero can also be used instead of oh). Minutes ":10" to ":59" are pronounced as their usual number-words. For instance, 6:02 a.m. can be pronounced six oh two a.m. whereas 6:32 a.m. could be told as six thirty-two a.m.

Confusion at noon and midnight

It is not always clear what times "12:00 a.m." and "12:00 p.m." denote. Since "noon" (midday,  (m.)) is neither before nor after itself, the terms a.m. and p.m. do not apply. Although "12 m." was suggested as a way to indicate noon, this is seldom done and also does not resolve the question of how to indicate midnight.

The American Heritage Dictionary of the English Language states "By convention, 12 AM denotes midnight and 12 PM denotes noon. Because of the potential for confusion, it is advisable to use 12 noon and 12 midnight."

E. G. Richards in his book Mapping Time (1999) provided a diagram in which 12 a.m. means noon and 12 p.m. means midnight.

The style manual of the United States Government Printing Office used 12 a.m. for noon and 12 p.m. for midnight until its 2008 edition, when it reversed these designations and then retained that change in its 2016 revision.

Many U.S. style guides, and NIST's "Frequently asked questions (FAQ)" web page, recommend that it is clearest if one refers to "noon" or "12:00 noon" and "midnight" or "12:00 midnight" (rather than to "12:00 p.m." and "12:00 a.m."). The NIST website states that "12 a.m. and 12 p.m. are ambiguous and should not be used."

The Associated Press Stylebook specifies that midnight "is part of the day that is ending, not the one that is beginning."

The Canadian Press Stylebook says, "write noon or midnight, not 12 noon or 12 midnight." Phrases such as "12 a.m." and "12 p.m." are not mentioned at all. Britain's National Physical Laboratory "FAQ-Time" web page states "In cases  where the context cannot be relied upon to place a particular event, the pair of days straddling midnight can be quoted"; also "the terms 12 a.m. and 12 p.m. should be avoided."

Likewise, some U.S. style guides recommend either clarifying "midnight" with other context clues, such as specifying the two dates between which it falls, or not referring to the term at all. For an example of the latter method, "midnight" is replaced with "11:59 p.m." for the end of a day or "12:01 a.m." for the start of a day. That has become common in the United States in legal contracts and for airplane, bus, or train schedules, though some schedules use other conventions. Occasionally, when trains run at regular intervals, the pattern may be broken at midnight by displacing the midnight departure one or more minutes, such as to 11:59 p.m. or 12:01 a.m.

In literature
In the George Orwell novel Nineteen Eighty-Four, Winston Smith describes a twelve-hour clock as "old-fashioned".

See also

 24-hour clock
 Clock position
 Date and time representation by country
 Decimal time
 Italian six-hour clock
 Midnight
 Muhurta
 Noon
 Pahar
 Thai six-hour clock

References

External links
 NIST FAQ on time
 12am is noon in Japan

Date and time representation
Time measurement systems